Classic Aerosmith: The Universal Masters Collection is a European compilation album by Aerosmith which features material from the band's time under the Geffen label.

Reception

Allmusic's Stephen Thomas Erlewine gave the album three out of five stars and called it, "a real hodgepodge that might have a few interesting rarities for collectors, but it won't satisfy any listeners just lookin' for the hits."

Track listing

References

2002 greatest hits albums
Aerosmith compilation albums
Albums produced by Bruce Fairbairn
Albums produced by Ted Templeman